Buchanan Bay is an Arctic waterway in Qikiqtaaluk Region, Nunavut, Canada. It is located in Nares Strait by eastern Ellesmere Island. The bay is bordered by Cape Camperdown on Bache Peninsula to the north, Cape Rutherford on Johan Peninsula to the south, and the Alexandra Fiord at its head.

Fauna
Muskox frequent the area.

References

Bays of Qikiqtaaluk Region
Ellesmere Island